is a 2011 Japanese film based on the true story of the science fiction writer Taku Mayumura. It was directed by Mamoru Hoshi, and stars actor Tsuyoshi Kusanagi and actress Yūko Takeuchi. The film is the fourth in the so-called "Boku Series" starring Kusanagi, and the first to based on a book. Much of the staff of the other three films continued their work on this film.

1,778 Stories of Me and My Wife was released in Japanese cinemas on 15 January 2011.

Plot
Sci-fiction author Sakutaro Makimura spends his days giving life to his daydreams, and enjoys a peaceful relationship with his wife Setsuko. One day, Setsuko is struck with stomach pains, and is later diagnosed with bowel cancer and given one year to live. After being told by her doctors that laughter boosts the body's immune system, Sakutaro decides to write one short story for his wife every day.

Cast
 Tsuyoshi Kusanagi as Sakutaro
 Yūko Takeuchi as Setsuko
 Ren Osugi as Setsuko's doctor
 Shosuke Tanihara as Takizawa, Sakutaro's best friend
 Michiko Kichise as Takizawa's wife
 Tai Kageyama (陰山泰) as Nimi, Sakutaro's editor
 Jun Fubuki as Setsuko's mother
 Yoko Imamoto as Sakutaro's mother
 Yasuto Kosuda (小須田康人) as a newspaper bill collector who appears in one of Sakutaro's short stories
 Kazuyuki Asano (浅野和之) as the owner of a toy store where Sakutaro buys the toy alien that inspires him to write his daily stories
 Sumie Sasaki (佐々木すみ江) as the Makimura's landlady
 Sakae Yamaura as a young Sakutaro
 Masaya Takahashi as a kindly hospital janitor who watches out for Sakutaro

Release
The film was released nationwide on January 15, 2011, earning ¥159.7 million and ranking first in its opening weekend. On January 20, 2011, it was shown in a special screening attended by the Empress.

References

External links
  
 

2011 films
2011 biographical drama films
Biographical films about writers
Toho films
2011 drama films
Japanese biographical drama films
2010s Japanese films